Wildside or Wild Side may refer to:

Film and television
 Wild Side (1995 film), an American film by Donald Cammell
 Wild Side (2004 film), a French/Belgian/British film by Sébastien Lifshitz
 Wild Side Show, a 1992 children's nature series, shortened to Wild Side for its second season
 Wildside (American TV series), a 1985 Western series
 Wildside (Australian TV series), a 1997–1999 police drama
 Wild Side, a defunct Japanese adult video studio founded by Kaoru Toyoda

Literature
 Wildside (comics), a Marvel Comics villain
 Wildside Press, an American independent publishing company
 Wildside, a 1996 science fiction novel by Steven Gould

Music
 Wildside (album), by Loverboy, and the title song, 1987
 Wildside Records, a New Zealand record label
 Wildside (band), a 1990s American metal band; see Dito Godwin

Songs
 "Wildside" (Marky Mark and the Funky Bunch song), 1991
 "Wild Side" (Normani song), 2021
 "Wild Side", by ALI, opening song for the anime Beastars, 2019
 "Wild Side", by Brian Justin Crum, 2017
 "Wild Side", by Chilldrin of da Ghetto from Chilldrin of da Ghetto, 1999
 "Wild Side", by Ezio from Live:Cambridge, 2004
 "Wild Side", by La Toya Jackson from No Relations, 1991
 "Wild Side", by Mötley Crüe from Girls, Girls, Girls, 1987
 "Wildside", by Red Velvet from Bloom, 2022
 "Wildside", by Sabrina Carpenter and Sofia Carson, 2016

Other uses
 Wildside (hiking trail), a hiking trail on Flores Island, British Columbia, Canada
 Wildside, the student section for Northwestern University Wildcats men's basketball games

See also
 Wild Side Story, a 1973 parody stage musical
 Wild Side West, a lesbian bar in San Francisco, California, US
 Wildsiderz, a comic-book series by J. Scott Campbell and Andy Hartnell
 Walk on the Wild Side (disambiguation)